Balázs Granát (born 24 May 1985 in Győr) is a Hungarian football player who currently plays for Diósgyőri VTK.

References 
HLSZ
Diósgyőri VTK Official Website

1985 births
Living people
Sportspeople from Győr
Hungarian footballers
Association football midfielders
Győri ETO FC players
Gyirmót FC Győr players
Nyíregyháza Spartacus FC players
Lombard-Pápa TFC footballers